William Winfield Clark (April 11, 1875 – April 15, 1959) was a professional baseball player. He was an infielder for one season (1897) with the Louisville Colonels. For his career, he compiled a .188 batting average in 16 at-bats, with two runs batted in.

He was born in Circleville, Ohio and later died in Los Angeles, California at the age of 84.

References

Further reading
 "Manager Win Clark Has Been Released". The State. September 5, 1908. p. 5.
 "Nerve Needed by Youngsters". The Wilkes-Barre Times Leader. p. 11.
 "Win Clark, Norfolk's Grand Old Man of Baseball, Honored on West Coast". Norfolk Virginian-Pilot. February 11, 1952. p. 17.

External links

1875 births
1959 deaths
19th-century baseball players
Louisville Colonels players
Major League Baseball infielders
Baseball players from Ohio
Birmingham Barons players
Norwich Reds players
New Bedford Whalers (baseball) players
Concord Marines players
Toronto Maple Leafs (International League) players
Manchester Colts players
Norfolk Tars players
Roanoke Tigers players
Portsmouth Truckers players
People from Circleville, Ohio
Staunton Hayseeds players
Hopewell Powder Puffs players